Sir William Henry Tucker Luce  (25 August 1907 – 7 July 1977) was a British colonial administrator and diplomat. He served as the Governor and Commander-in-Chief of Aden from 1956 to 1960.

Luce was the son of Rear Admiral John Luce and Mary Dorothea Tucker. He was educated at Clifton College. His brother was Sir David Luce, who served as First Sea Lord of the Royal Navy. His granddaughter is comedian Miranda Hart.

Luce ended his career in Sudan as Adviser to the Governor-General on Constitutional and External Affairs and was knighted in 1956. After four years as Governor of Aden he became Political Resident in the Persian Gulf from 1961 to 1966.

He married Margaret Napier, daughter of Trevylyan Napier, who was the Commander-in-Chief, America and West Indies Station (1919–1920). By her he had two children:
Richard Luce, Baron Luce (b. 14 October 1936)
Diana Luce, married David Hart Dyke, mother to Miranda Hart.

Luce died in 1977, aged 69.

References

1907 births
1977 deaths
alumni of Christ's College, Cambridge
British diplomats
Colony of Aden people
Knights Commander of the Order of St Michael and St George
Knights Grand Cross of the Order of the British Empire
people educated at Clifton College
Sudan Political Service officers